Ariyappampalayam is a panchayat town in Erode district  in the state of Tamil Nadu, India.

Demographics
 India census, Ariyappampalayam had a population of 12,274. Males constitute 50% of the population and females 50%. Ariyappampalayam has an average literacy rate of 54%, lower than the national average of 59.5%; with 59% of the males and 41% of females literate. 11% of the population is under 6 years of age.

References

Cities and towns in Erode district